Carmine Colucci Neto (born 29 May 1975), known as Neto Colucci, is a Brazilian football coach and former futsal player and manager.

Career
Born in Vassouras, Rio de Janeiro, Colucci played futsal professionally for Piraí, Mendes and Vassouras before joining Fluminense's futsal side for the 2003 season; as the regulation at the time only allowed him to play in the Copa Rio Sul de Futsal as a manager, he switched to his new role.

Colucci subsequently worked as manager of futsal sides Vasco da Gama, Vassouras (where he won four consecutive Copa Rio Sul de Futsal titles), Piraí and Mendes. In May 2015, he switched to football and was appointed manager of Volta Redonda's under-20 squad. 

Colucci returned to play for Mendes in the 2017 season, while still working for Volta Redonda. In January 2018, he was named manager of futsal side Paulo de Frontin, also sharing roles with his Voltaço job.

In May 2018, Colucci was appointed at the helm of Pérolas Negras in the Campeonato Carioca Série B2. He subsequently returned to Volta Redonda and their under-20 squad, and also submitted a candidacy to the club's presidency late in the year; he later withdrew his candidacy.

Colucci was promoted to the assistant manager role at Voltaços first team squad in January 2020. He left the club in September to take over Botafogo's under-17 squad, but returned to his previous club on 27 October as manager of the main squad in the Série C.

On 28 February 2022, Colucci was sacked by Voltaço.

Honours

Manager
Vassouras
Copa Rio Sul de Futsal: 2008, 2009, 2010, 2011

Piraí
Copa Rio Sul de Futsal: 2013

Paulo de Frontin
Copa Rio Sul de Futsal: 2018

References

External links
 

1955 births
Living people
Sportspeople from Rio de Janeiro (state)
Brazilian men's futsal players
Brazilian football managers
Campeonato Brasileiro Série C managers
Volta Redonda Futebol Clube managers
People from Vassouras